The Arkoma School in Arkoma in Le Flore County, Oklahoma was a Works Progress Administration-funded project completed in 1937.  It was listed on the National Register of Historic Places in 1988.

It is a four-room  building built of cut and coursed local sandstone, with a hipped roof.  It was still in use as a school in 1988.

Its NRHP nomination asserts that in its design there is an allusion to Richardsonian Romanesque style, but it is a straightforward construction.  Its design was taken from a pattern book of the Oklahoma State Department of Education.

References

National Register of Historic Places in Le Flore County, Oklahoma
Romanesque Revival architecture in Oklahoma
School buildings completed in 1937
LeFlore County, Oklahoma